The Benefactor (French: Le bienfaiteur) is a 1942 French drama film directed by Henri Decoin and starring Raimu, Suzy Prim and Pierre Larquey.

The film's sets were designed by the art director Serge Piménoff.

Synopsis
This film portrays a man who leads a double life. In his home town in the provinces he is a respected citizen, but in Paris he is an underworld gang leader.

Cast
 Raimu as Monsieur Moulinet  
 Suzy Prim as Irène Berger  
 Pierre Larquey as Noblet  
 Lucienne Delyle as La chanteuse  
 René Bergeron as Le conservateur des hypothèques 
 Yves Deniaud as Vinchon 
 Alexandre Rignault as Le patron  
 Héléna Manson as Gertrude, la bonne 
 André Fouché as Claude de Vitrac  
 Pierre Jourdan as Le type du bar  
 Louis Salou as Deltouche - le bijoutier  
 Marguerite Ducouret as Madame Noblet  
 Rosine Luguet as Noémie  
 Anne Vandène as Simone  
 Made Siamé as Madame Barraton - la patronne du bar  
 Georges Jamin as Gras-Double  
 Pierre Cueille as Calumel  
 Gustave Gallet as Le pharmacien  
 François Viguier as Le docteur Pintard  
 Jo Dervo 
 Marcel Maupi as Jambe d'Azur  
 Julien Maffre as Juliard  
 Marcel Melrac
 Joffre as Le jardinier  
 Jacques Baumer as Le directeur de la P.J.  
 Lucien Gallas as Bébert  
 Georges Colin as L'inspecteur Picard  
 Charles Granval as Le maire 
 Dorys Dumont 
 Richard Francoeur 
 Marcelle Monthil as La monitrice  
 Émile Saint-Ober
 Simone Signoret as La sécrétaire du journal

References

Bibliography 
 Hayward, Susan. Simone Signoret: The Star as Cultural Sign. A&C Black, 2004.

External links 
 

1942 films
French drama films
1942 drama films
1940s French-language films
Films directed by Henri Decoin
Films set in Paris
French black-and-white films
1940s French films